Schulmerich may refer to:

 Edward Schulmerich (1863–1937), American businessman and politician
 Wes Schulmerich (1901–1985), American baseball player
 Schulmerich (bell maker), a handbell manufacturer in Hatfield, Pennsylvania